Andrew Robinson Stoney, later renamed Andrew Robinson Stoney-Bowes, (1747–1810) was an Anglo-Irish member of parliament, high sheriff, and criminal.

Stoney grew up at Greyfort House, Borrisokane, County Tipperary in Ireland, son of George Stoney and Elizabeth Johnston. His grandfather, Thomas Stoney, had migrated to Ireland from Yorkshire, England, in the wake of the Williamite conquest of Ireland, 1689–91.

While Andrew Stoney-Bowes was a member of parliament for Newcastle-upon-Tyne (1780–4) and also High Sheriff of Durham, he is perhaps best remembered for his marriage to Mary Eleanor Bowes, the Dowager Countess of Strathmore and Kinghorne, during which, it was later shown, he was severely abusive towards his wife. Mary Eleanor Bowes became known as "The Unhappy Countess", perhaps due to the abuse she suffered, and their marriage ended in scandal. The story of Stoney-Bowes and the Countess of Strathmore was later fictionalised by William Makepeace Thackeray in The Luck of Barry Lyndon. Stanley Kubrick later adapted the novel into the 1975 award-winning film Barry Lyndon.

Early life

First marriage 
Stoney's first wife, Hannah, was the daughter of William Newton of Burnopfield. It was widely believed that Stoney Bowes caused her death to assume her inheritance.

Second marriage 
Mary Eleanor Bowes, the widowed Countess of Strathmore and Kinghorne, was engaged to her lover, George Gray, in the summer of 1777 when she met the outwardly charming but wily Anglo-Irish adventurer, Andrew Robinson Stoney, who manipulated his way into her household and her bed. Calling himself "Captain Stoney" – although he was, in reality, a lieutenant in the British Army – he insisted on fighting a duel in Mary's honour with the editor of The Morning Post newspaper which had published scurrilous articles about her private life. In fact, he had himself written the articles that criticised her, as well as those defending her; and the duel between Stoney and the newspaper's editor was probably staged. Pretending to be mortally wounded in the duel, Stoney persuaded the countess as his dying wish to marry him. He was carried to the altar on a stretcher for his marriage to the Countess. Staging a miraculous recovery immediately after the marriage, Stoney took his wife's surname (as stipulated by her father's will) and was styled Andrew Robinson Stoney Bowes. He served as High Sheriff of Durham in 1780 and was elected MP for Newcastle later the same year, serving until he lost the next election in 1784.

After his marriage to the Countess, he behaved brutally towards her in a sustained catalogue of abuse, including physical, mental and financial abuse. When he discovered that she had secretly made a pre-nuptial agreement safeguarding her finances, he forced her to sign a revocation handing control to him. Among other outrages, he imprisoned her in her own house, and forced her and one of her daughters to go into exile in Paris. They returned after a writ had been served on him. At the same time, he raped the maids, invited prostitutes into the home and fathered numerous illegitimate children.

Mary Eleanor gave birth in August 1777 to a daughter Mary, probably the child of her prior liaison with Gray. Bowes took the girl as his own child and the birth was registered as such in November 1777, but he later broadcast her illegitimacy. The couple had a son, William Johnstone Bowes, born on 8 May 1782.

Finally, in 1785, with the help of loyal maids, the Countess managed to escape his custody and filed for divorce through the ecclesiastical courts. Having lost the first round of this courtroom battle, Stoney Bowes abducted Mary with the help of a gang of accomplices, carried her off to the north country, threatened to rape and kill her, gagged and beat her, and carried her around the countryside on horseback in one of the coldest spells of the coldest winter of the century. The country was alerted, and Stoney Bowes was eventually arrested and the countess rescued.

The legal battles continued. Stoney Bowes and his accomplices were found guilty of conspiracy to abduct Mary, and he was sentenced to three years in prison. Meanwhile, he lost the divorce case and the battle to retain the Bowes fortune. The trials were sensational and the talk of London. Although the countess initially won public sympathy, Bowes eventually turned many against her – partly because of the libels he succeeded in putting about (buying shares in a newspaper for the purpose and publishing the 'Confessions' he had earlier forced her to write) – and partly because the general apprehension was that she had behaved badly in attempting to prevent her husband's access to her fortune. There had also been an affair between her and the brother of one of the lawyers, which became public knowledge, and, Stoney Bowes alleged, an affair with her footman, George Walker. Mary finally obtained her divorce at the High Court of Delegates on 2 March 1789 which revealed how Bowes had systematically deprived the countess of her liberty and abused her.

Andrew Robinson Stoney-Bowes died on 16 January 1810 in the Rules of the King's Bench Prison, Southwark, London.

Many years later, Thackeray learned of Stoney Bowes' life story from the Countess's grandson John Bowes and used it in his novel The Luck of Barry Lyndon.

References

Sources 
 Arnold, Ralph, The Unhappy Countess (1957)
 Foot, Jesse, The Lives of Andrew Robinson Bowes, Esq., and the Countess of Strathmore, written from thirty-three years professional attendance, from Letters and other well authenticated documents (1810)
 
 Parker, Derek, The Trampled Wife (2006)
 Moore, Wendy, Wedlock: How Georgian Britain's Worst Husband Met his Match (2009)

See also 
 Bowes-Lyon

External links 
 

1747 births
1810 deaths
18th-century Anglo-Irish people
High Sheriffs of Durham
People from Borrisokane